Frederick R. Dickinson is a professor of Japanese history at the University of Pennsylvania.

Career
Dickinson teaches courses in the University of Pennsylvania Department of History on modern Japan, East Asian diplomacy, as well as politics and nationalism in Asia. The Japanese Ministry of Education, the Fulbright Commission, and the Japan Foundation have conferred grants upon him, and he was a National Fellow at the Hoover Institution (Stanford University, 2000–2001) and visiting research scholar at the International Research Center for Japanese Studies (Kyoto, 2011–12).

Publications

Books 

 2015 – World War I and the Triumph of a New Japan, 1919–1930. Cambridge University Press.
 2009 - Taisho tenno. Minerva Press.
 2001 – War and National Reinvention: Japan in the Great War, 1914-1919 . Harvard University Asia Center.

Personal
Dickinson was born in Tokyo, and raised in Kanazawa and Kyoto, all in Japan.

References

External links
 Frederick Dickinson profile page, University of Pennsylvania Department of History.

Living people
Yale Graduate School of Arts and Sciences alumni
21st-century American historians
American male non-fiction writers
Historians of Japan
University of Pennsylvania faculty
University of Pennsylvania historian
Kyoto University alumni
Year of birth missing (living people)
21st-century American male writers